The 54th annual Berlin International Film Festival was held from 5–15 February 2004. The festival opened with out of competition film Cold Mountain by Anthony Minghella. 25 Degrees in Winter by Stéphane Vuillet served as the closing film. The Golden Bear was awarded to German-Turkish film Head-On directed by Fatih Akın.

The retrospective dedicated to films from 1967 to 1976 titled New Hollywood 1967-1976. Trouble in Wonderland was shown at the festival. It focuses on the films from the period known as New Hollywood or American New Wave, and attended by some of the film-makers and actors of that era including Peter Davis, Peter Fonda, William Greaves, Monte Hellman and Melvin Van Peebles.

Jury 

The following people were announced as being on the jury for the festival:

International Jury
 Frances McDormand, actress (United States) - Jury President
 Maji-da Abdi, director (Ethiopia)
 Valeria Bruni Tedeschi, actress (Italy)
 Samira Makhmalbaf, director (Iran)
 Peter Rommel, producer (Germany)
 Gabriele Salvatores, director and screenwriter (Italy)
 Dan Talbot, distributor (United States)

International Short Film Jury
 Christine Dollhofer, journalist and event creator (Austria)
 Sophie Maintigneux, director of photography (France)
 Vinca Wiedemann, producer (Denmark)

Official selection

In competition
The following films were in competition for the Golden Bear and Silver Bear awards:

Short Film
The following short films were selected:

Key
{| class="wikitable" width="550" colspan="1"
| style="background:#FFDEAD;" align="center"| †
|Winner of the main award for best film in its section
|-
| colspan="2"| The opening and closing films are screened during the opening and closing ceremonies respectively.
|}

Awards

The following prizes were awarded by the Jury:
Golden Bear
Head-On: Fatih Akın
Silver Bear
Best Film Music – First Love: Banda Osiris
Best Actor – Lost Embrace: Daniel Hendler
Best Actress – Maria Full of Grace: Catalina Sandino Moreno and Monster: Charlize Theron
Best Director – Samaritan Girl: Kim Ki-duk
Best Short Film – Great!: Karin Junger, Brigit Hillenius
Outstanding Artistic Achievement – Daybreak: Leif Andrée, Pernilla August, Jan Coster, Jakob Eklund, Ingvar Hirdwall, Magnus Krepper, Johan Kvarnström, Camilla Larsson, Marika Lindström, Peter Lorentzon, Hampus Penttinen, Ann Petrén, Marie Richardson, Jenny Svärdsäter, Claes-Göran Turesson
Jury Grand Prix
Lost Embrace: Daniel Burman
Silver Bear – Honorable Mention
Best Short Film – Public/Private: Christoph Behl
Honorary Golden Bear
Fernando E. Solanas
Berlinale Camera
Willy Sommerfeld
Regina Ziegler
Erika Rabau
Rolf Bähr
Best Short Film
Cigarettes and Coffee: Cristi Puiu
Panorama Audience Award
Best Feature Film – Addicted to Acting: Andres Veiel
Best Short Film – Passing Hearts: Johan Brisinger
Crystal Bear
Best Short Film – Nuit d'orage: Michèle Lemieux
Best Feature Film – Magnifico: Maryo J. De Los Reyes
14plus: Best Feature Film – The Wooden Camera: Ntshaveni Wa Luruli
Crystal Bear – Special Mention
Best Short Film – Circuit marine: Isabelle Favez and Maree: James Pellerito
Best Feature Film- The Blind Flyers: Bernd Sahling and Raining Cats and Frogs: Jacques-Rémy Girerd
14plus: Best Feature Film – Quality of Life: Benjamin Morgan
FIPRESCI Award
Head-On: Fatih Akın

References

External links
 54th Berlin International Film Festival on IMDb
 Yearbook for 2004 Berlinale on berlinale.de
 54th Berlin International Film Festival 2004

Berlin International Film Festival
B
B
2004 in Berlin
2004 in German cinema